Toughest Man Alive is a 1955 American drama film directed by Sidney Salkow and starring Dane Clark, Lita Milan, and Anthony Caruso. Based on an original screenplay by Steve Fisher, the film was released on November 6, 1955.

Plot

Cast
 Dane Clark as Lee Stevens aka Pete Gore
 Lita Milan as Lida Montoya
 Anthony Caruso as Pete Gore
 Ross Elliott as Cal York
 Myrna Dell as Nancy York
 Thomas B. Henry as Ed Dolphin
 Paul Levitt as Don
 John Eldredge as Widmer
 Dehl Berti as Salvador
 Richard Karlan as Morgan
 Syd Saylor as Proprietor
 Jonathan Seymour as Agency chief
 Don Mathers as Bank manager
 William Haade as Henchman hired by Lee

References

External links
 
 
 

Allied Artists films
Films directed by Sidney Salkow
1955 drama films
1955 films
American drama films
American black-and-white films
1950s English-language films
1950s American films